F.B.I. Frog Butthead Investigators is a 2012 French / Belgian comedy film written and directed by Kad Merad and Olivier Baroux, sequel of the movie "Mais qui a tué Pamela Rose?"(2003), followed by "Bullit & Riper" (2020).

Cast 
 Kad Merad as Richard Bullit
 Olivier Baroux as Douglas Riper
 Omar Sy as Mosby
 Laurent Lafitte as Perkins
 Audrey Fleurot as La Présidente
 Guy Lecluyse as Kowachek
 Philippe Lefebvre as Commandant de bord
 Laurence Arné as Linda
 Xavier Letourneur as Donuts
  as Le président français
 Lionel Abelanski as Le lieutenel
 Patrick Bosso as Le mari de la stagiaire de Riper

References

External links 

2012 comedy films
2012 films
French comedy films
Belgian comedy films
2010s French films
Foreign films set in the United States